The Quintom scenario (derived from the words quintessence and phantom, as in phantom energy) is a hypothetical model of dark energy.

Equation of State

In this scenario, the equation of state  of the dark energy, relating its pressure and energy density, can cross the boundary  associated with the cosmological constant. A no-go theorem shows that this behavior requires at least two degrees of freedom for dark energy models involving ideal gases or scalar fields. 

The Quintom scenario was applied in 2008 to produce a model of inflationary cosmology with a Big Bounce instead of a Big Bang singularity.

References

External links
 Dark Energy Constraints from the Cosmic Age and Supernova by Bo Feng, Xiulian Wang and Xinmin Zhang 
 Crossing the Phantom Divide by Martin Kunz and Domenico Sapone  

Dark energy

fr:Énergie fantôme
it:Energia fantasma